Retlatur is an Espiritu Santo language of Vanuatu. There are about 100 speakers in Tanovusivusi village of southern Santo Island.

References

Sources

Tryon, Darrell. 2010. The languages of Espiritu Santo, Vanuatu. In John Bowden and Nikolaus P. Himmelmann and Malcolm Ross (eds.), A journey through Austronesian and Papuan linguistic and cultural space: papers in honour of Andrew K. Pawley, 283-290. Canberra: Research School of Pacific and Asian Studies, Australian National University.

Malekula languages
Languages of Vanuatu